An air superiority fighter (or air-superiority fighter) is a fighter aircraft designed to seize control of enemy airspace by establishing tactical dominance (air superiority) over the opposing air force.  Air-superiority fighters are primarily tasked to perform aerial combat against agile, lightly armed aircraft (most often enemy fighters) and eliminate any challenge over control of the airspace, although some (e.g. strike fighters) may have a secondary role for air-to-surface attacks.

Evolution of the term
During World War II and through the Korean War, fighters were classified by their role: heavy fighter, interceptor, escort fighter, night fighter, and so forth. With the development of guided missiles in the 1950s, design diverged between fighters optimized to fight in the beyond visual range (BVR) regime (interceptors), and fighters optimized to fight in the within visual range (WVR) regime (air-superiority fighters). In the United States, the influential proponents of BVR developed fighters with no forward-firing gun, such as the original F-4 Phantom II, as it was thought that they would never need to resort to WVR combat. These aircraft would sacrifice high maneuverability, and instead focus on other performance characteristics, as they presumably would never engage in a dogfight with enemy fighters.

The first air-superiority fighters
After lessons learned from combat experiences involving modern military air capacity, the U.S. Navy's VFAX/VFX and U.S. Air Force's F-X (Fighter Experimental) reassessed their tactical direction which resulted in the U.S. Navy's F-14 Tomcat and US Air Force's F-15 Eagle. The two designs were built to achieve air superiority and significant consideration was given during the development of both aircraft to allow them to excel at the shorter ranges of fighter combat. Both aircraft also serve as interceptors due to their high maximum speed.

By contrast, the Soviets (and the succeeding Russian Federation) developed and continue to operate separate types of aircraft, the interceptor MiG-31 and the short-range MiG-29 for air superiority, although the long-range Su-27 can combine the roles of air superiority and interceptor.

Evolution of secondary ground-attack capability
For the US Navy, the F-14 Tomcat was initially deployed solely as an air-superiority fighter, as well as fleet defense interceptor and tactical aerial reconnaissance. By contrast, the multirole F/A-18 Hornet was designed as strike fighter while having only enough of an edge to defend itself against enemy fighters if needed. While the F-14 had an undeveloped secondary ground attack capability (with a Stores Management System (SMS) that included air-to-ground options as well as rudimentary software in the AWG-9), the Navy did not want to risk it in the air-to-ground role at the time, due to its lack of proper defensive electronic countermeasures (DECM) and radar homing and warning (RHAW) for overland operations, as well as the fighter's high cost. In the 1990s, the US Navy added LANTIRN pods to its F-14s and deployed them on precision ground-attack missions.

The F-15 Eagle was envisioned originally as an air-superiority fighter and interceptor under the mantra "not a pound for air-to-ground". However, the F-15C can carry "dumb" and GPS guided bombs, such capabilities which were first used by Israeli Air Force. In fact, the basic airframe proved versatile enough to produce a very capable strike fighter, the F-15E Strike Eagle. While designed for ground attack, it retains the air-to-air lethality of the original F-15.  Similarly, the F-16 Fighting Falcon was also originally designed as fighter but has since evolved into a successful all-weather multirole aircraft.

Since the 1990s, with air-superiority fighters such as the F-14 and F-15 pressed into the strike role and/or having a strike derivative, the lines between air-superiority fighters and multirole fighters has blurred somewhat. The F-22 Raptor, designed primarily as an air superiority fighter, would receive some strike capability through mission system upgrades. Similarly the MiG-29 and Su-27, despite originally designed for air superiority, have been commonly outfitted to use a range of air-to-surface armaments which would make them multirole fighters, indeed the Su-34 strike fighter has been derived from the Su-27.

With the retirement of the F-14 Tomcat, the US Navy has pressed its F/A-18 Hornet and its upsized derivative, the F/A-18E/F Super Hornet, into fleet defence fighter, despite the Hornets being originally designed as multirole strike fighters. Due to the high costs of aircraft development, the next generation of USAF air superiority platforms will be multirole with strike capabilities designed from the outset.

A possible definition of an air-superiority fighter is a fighter capable of at least Mach 2 with a range greater than 3,000km without refueling in-flight and armed with 8+ missiles, capable of engaging enemy fighters with missiles beyond the visual range and with IR missiles and gun in an agile dogfight, all in one mission.

List of active air-superiority fighters

See also

Interceptor aircraft
Fighter aircraft

Notes

External links
 Glossary of Nato Definitions 
 Rand: Revival of the Air-Superiority Fighter

Fighter aircraft